Cryptolepis dubia is a species of flowering plant in the family Apocynaceae that can be found in South and Southeast Asia, as well as southern China.

References

External links
 
 
 International Plant Names Index

Periplocoideae
Flora of Indo-China
Flora of the Indian subcontinent
Flora of China